Spring Tide is a Swedish television drama series. It had its premiere on 6 March 2016 on SVT. It was written by Rolf and Cilla Börjlind and is based on their crime novel of the same name published in 2012.

The two leads are played by Kjell Bergqvist (Tom Stilton) and Julia Ragnarsson (Olivia Rönning). Bergqvist won a Kristallen award for "Best Male Actor in a Television Series".

The second series premiered in September 2018.

Plot 

Season 1 – In August 1990, the sadistic murder of a pregnant woman is committed on the island of Nordkoster, western Sweden. The victim is buried alive in the sand, so that the rising tide slowly drowns her. In June 2015, the murder, known as the Beach Case remains unsolved. Olivia Rönning, a trainee at the Stockholm Police Academy, is assigned the cold case for a summer project. Upon discovering that her late father worked on the original case, Olivia becomes obsessed with solving the murder. She searches for the lead investigator Tom Stilton, who has since become homeless and does not want to be reminded of his old life. Horrifying videos show up on the Internet in which other homeless people are brutally attacked including a friend of Tom's. Eventually Tom helps Olivia to investigate the murder. Along the way they are helped by Tom's former colleague, Mette Olsäter and their mutual friend Abbas el Fassi. They are thwarted by Rune Forss, a corrupt policeman and by Jackie Berglund, a former prostitute, madame and current store owner.

Season 2 – In late 2017 Olivia's near neighbour, Bengt Sahlman, is found hanging in his home by his teenage daughter, Sandra. He was a Customs officer. Meanwhile in Marseilles, Samira Khalil's dismembered body is discarded at the shoreline. She was a blind actress and former circus performer. Abbas loved Samira but she was then-married and so he left the city. Olivia has completed her final year at the academy but not yet chosen a posting. She decides to unofficially investigate Bengt's death, while Tom and Abbas go to Marseilles to find out about Samira. Mette and her team believe Bengt's death is related to missing drugs at Customs. Samira's murder leads to the local underworld of prostitution and porn films. First Tom then Abbss return to Stockholm leaving local police to look for the murder suspect, Alain Bressant. In Stockholm Olivia teams with TV investigative journalist, Alex Popov. They pursue Jean Morrel the owner of Albion, which used a dangerous medicine causing aged care deaths being covered up; including that of Bengt's father. Eventually both Bengt's and Samira's murders are linked by evidence found on a laptop.

Cast 

 Julia Ragnarsson as Olivia Rönning, a police academy trainee, she researches the Beach Case from 25 years earlier. Her late father, Arne Rönning (1955–2011), had been a police investigator on that case.
 Olivia has now completed her training, taken 6 months holiday and returned to help a near neighbour Sandra Sahlman after she sees her father, Bengt, hanging dead in their home.
 Kjell Bergqvist as Tom "Jelle" Stilton, a former police detective, who led the Beach Case. As Jelle, he is homeless on the streets of Stockholm. He does not want to return to his old life.
 Living on an inherited property on the Stockholm Archipelago, he is asked by Abbas to help investigate the murder of his former girlfriend in Marseilles.
 Jessica Zandén as Maria Rönning, Olivia's mother.
 Olivia blames her for not being told about being adopted. Maria has a new boyfriend.
 Dag Malmberg as Nils Wendt. Founder of MWM, mining company, disappeared from Stockholm 27 years ago. As Dan Nilsson, lived in Mexico and then Costa Rica. Returns to Sweden in June 2015. Dead.
 Cecilia Nilsson as Mette Olsäter, detective police commissioner, Tom's former colleague.
 Her health results in cardiac problems. Temporarily replaced by Rune.
 Anna Wallander as Vera Larsson, homeless woman, lives in an abandoned caravan, Jelle's friend. Dead.
 Björn Andrésen as Benseman, homeless man, former librarian, Jelle's friend, hospitalised by two thugs.
 Gustav Lindh as Liam Olsson, thug, bashes homeless people, former cage fighter, recruits Acke.
 Dakota Williams as Adam Sharew, thug, former cage fighter, Liam's offsider.
 Josefin Iziamo as Muriel, homeless woman, drug addict, Jelle's friend.
 Does not continue rehab, now on new illegal drug: 5-IT.
 Johan Widerberg as "Minken" Minqvist, petty criminal, Tom's ex-snitch.
 Loan sharks threaten to harm him as he tries to evade paying. Tries to get Tom involved in his schemes.
 Kjell Wilhelmsen as Rune Forss, police detective with shady criminal associates. Professional rival with mutual dislike for Tom.
 Promoted above Mette in her division. He tries to get rid of her. Arrests Tom and withholds medications.
 Stefan Gödicke as Janne Klinga, Rune's police colleague.
 Dar Salim as Abbas el Fassi, a former knife thrower, assists Mette, Tom's friend.
 Returns to Marseilles, his hometown to investigate the murder of his former lover, Samira.
 Michael Segerström as Mårten Olsäter, a child psychologist, Mette's husband.
 Helps Sandra deal with her grief after her father was killed.
 Helena Bergström as Linn Magnusson, CEO of MWM. Troubled by phone calls from Dan. Dead.
 Malena Engström as Ovette Andersson, prostitute, Minken's friend.
 Formerly employed by Jackie but discarded after becoming pregnant to a client.
 Leonard Heinemann as Acke Andersson, school student, Ovette's son, starts working as a cage fighter.
 Görel Crona as Jackie Berglund, shop owner, former prostitute then pimp.
 Investigated for her client list, which includes Rune.
 Angela Kovács as Eva Carlsén, social psychologist, author.
 Paloma Winneth as Beach Case murder victim.
 Michaela Thorsén as Lisa Edkvist, police detective sergeant, Mette's squad.
 Rune wants her to replace Mette. 
 Arvin Kananian as Bo "Bosse" Thyrén, police detective, Mette's squad.

Season 2 only
 Saga Samuelsson as Sandra Sahlman, secondary school student, near neighbour of Olivia's mother, finds her father hanged in her home. Has trouble coping with her grief, befriends Olivia, seeks help from Mårten.
 Nemanja Stojanovic as Alex Popovic, a TV investigative journalist, works with Olivia to detect a link between untimely deaths at an aged care home.
 Mårten Klingberg as Jean Borell, owner of Albion, which contracts for aged care homes, covers up deaths at Silvergåarden after recommending a faulty medication.
 Alexandra Rapaport as Charlotte Pram, a flight attendant, Sandra's aunt, takes custody after Bengt's death.
 Marie Berto as Michelle Fabre, Marseilles-based police chief, investigates Samira's death. Known to Tom from his police days.
 Reine Brynolfsson as Magnus Thorhed, Jean's enforcer, cleans up after him.
 Amanda Ooms as Luna Johansson, barge owner, rents a cabin to Tom.
 Anna Bjelkerud as Margit Welin, runs one of Albion's aged care homes, sometime-lover of Magnus.
 Siham Shurafa as Samira Khalil, blind woman, former circus performer, singer, actress. Abbas' former lover. Later a prostitute and porn star. Murdered and dismembered in Marseilles. Also as Nidal Khalil, Samira's older sister.
 Robin Stegmar as Thomas Welander, vicar, close friend of Bengt and Charlotte. Helps look after Sandra.
 Cecilia Frode as Gabriella Forsman, Customs agent, worked with Bengt.
 Nicky Naudé as Alain Bressant, Marseilles gigolo.
 Jonas Sjöqvist as Bengt Sahlman, Customs officer, found hanged in his home. Sandra's father.
 Rebecka Teper as Ann Gunberg, councillor, charmed by Jean to grant lucrative aged care contracts.
 Jean-Yves Tual as Pujol, former circus clown, Samira's friend.
 Anna Tulestedt as Marie Densrup, former circus contortionist, Samira's friend.
 Mark Grosy as Philippe Martiin, pimp, pornographer and drug lord, duped Samira into working for him.
 Najeh Hrichi as Josef, Philippe's henchman, bashes Pujol.

Episodes

Series 1 (2016)

Series 2 (2018)

References

2016 Swedish television series debuts
2016 Swedish television series endings
Television series set in 1990
Bohuslän in fiction
Television shows set in Stockholm
Television series set in 2015
Television shows set in Costa Rica
Swedish drama television series
Swedish crime television series
2010s crime television series
Swedish-language television shows